Daniel Sylvester Tuttle (January 26, 1837 – April 17, 1923) was consecrated a bishop of the Episcopal Church in 1866. His first assignment was as Bishop of Montana, a missionary field that included Montana, Utah, and Idaho.

Early and family life
He was born on January 26, 1837, and graduated from an academy in Delhi, New York in 1850. Bishop Wainwright confirmed him in the Episcopal Church shortly before he entered what was then Columbia College. After graduating in 1857, Tuttle attended the General Theological Seminary and graduated in 1862.

He married the former Harriet Minerva Foote, of Greene County, New York, and the couple had many children before her death in St. Louis, Missouri, in 1899 during one of her husband's missionary journeys.

Career
He was ordained deacon by year's end and in 1863, he was ordained priest and assigned rural parishes. He learned he had been elected missionary bishop of the territory of Montana, with additional jurisdiction over Utah and Idaho. Presiding Bishop John Henry Hopkins of Vermont, along with Bishops Horatio Potter of New York and William Henry Odenheimer of New Jersey consecrated their young colleague. Since Tuttle was only 29, canon law required him to wait until he was 30 before he could exercise his office. He took the Union Pacific Railroad as far west as then possible, to North Platte, Nebraska, then boarded a stage coach for Denver, Colorado and arrived on June 11, 1867. He eventually established his home base in Salt Lake City, but traveled widely, by railroad and other means. In 1880 Montana was removed from his mission, leaving him with Utah and Idaho. In 1886 the General Convention added territory in Nevada, since the missionary bishop of Nevada and Arizona, Ozi William Whitaker, had translated and become bishop of Pennsylvania. Instead, Tuttle accepted a call to serve as bishop of Missouri although he had rejected a similar offer in 1868.

During Tuttle's residency in Salt Lake City, he oversaw the construction of St. Mark's Cathedral, the first non-Mormon religious building in Utah, followed by the establishment of St. Mark's School for boys and girls in 1867, St. Mark's Hospital in 1872, and Rowland Hall school for girls in 1881.

On May 26, 1886, Bishop Tuttle was elected bishop of the Diocese of Missouri. According to his own published remembrances, he became the bishop of Missouri when on the morning of August 9, 1886, he read the letter notifying him of his election to that see. "When I took the letter in hand to read, I was Bishop of Utah, and after I had read it, as I understood the matter, I was [translated as] Bishop of Missouri."  (Missionary to the Mountain West:  Reminiscences of Episcopal Bishop Daniel S. Tuttle, 1866-1886. "Second Call to Missouri, 1886", Daniel Sylvester Tuttle, University of Utah Press, Salt Lake City, 1906, p. 480.)  Bishop Tuttle served in that position in the Diocese of Missouri until his death. From 1903 to 1923, Tuttle also served as presiding bishop of the Episcopal Church in the United States of America. The presiding bishop, at the time of Tuttle's consecration, was the senior bishop in order of consecration, and Tuttle ended up serving as bishop for 56 years and helped consecrate 89 bishops.

During his tenure as presiding bishop, Tuttle preached at the closing service of the 1908 Lambeth Conference in St Paul's Cathedral in London, England.

Tuttle wrote a memoir, called Reminiscences of a Missionary Bishop, published in 1906. His memoir has extensive first-person accounts of his service among the Mormons in Salt Lake City, including his meetings and other dealings with Brigham Young and other local leaders.

Death
He died on April 17, 1923, and was buried at Bellefontaine Cemetery in St. Louis, Missouri.

See also

 List of presiding bishops of the Episcopal Church in the United States of America
 List of Episcopal bishops of the United States
 Historical list of the Episcopal bishops of the United States
Episcopal Diocese of Idaho
Episcopal Diocese of Montana
Episcopal Diocese of Missouri
Episcopal Diocese of Utah

References

Further reading
 . Online reprint, with permission, at EpiscopalChurch.org.
 . Online reprint, with permission, at HistoryToGo.Utah.gov

External links

 Bibliographic directory of material by and about Daniel Sylvester Tuttle from Project Canterbury
 Episcopal Church biography of Daniel Sylvester Tuttle at EpiscopalChurch.org

1837 births
1923 deaths
Presiding Bishops of the Episcopal Church in the United States of America
Episcopal bishops of Missouri
People of Utah Territory
Episcopal Church in Idaho
Episcopal Church in Utah
General Theological Seminary alumni
Episcopal bishops of Idaho
Episcopal bishops of Montana
Episcopal bishops of Utah